Celina High School may refer to:

Celina High School (Ohio) —  Celina, Ohio
Celina High School (Celina, Tennessee) — Celina, Tennessee
Celina High School (Texas) — Celina, Texas